The 1975 Pacific Northwest hurricane was an unusual Pacific tropical cyclone that attained hurricane status farther north than any other Pacific hurricane. It was officially unnamed, with the cargo ship  providing vital meteorological data in assessing the storm. The twelfth tropical cyclone of the 1975 Pacific hurricane season, it developed from a cold-core upper-level low merging with the remnants of a tropical cyclone on August 31, well to the northeast of Hawaii. Convection increased as the circulation became better defined, and by early on September 2, it became a tropical storm. After maintaining peak winds for about 18 hours, the storm rapidly weakened, as it interacted with an approaching Cold front. Early on September 5, it lost its identity near the coast of Alaska.

Meteorological history

The remnants of Ilsa drifted northwestward through the stratocumulus cloud field in the eastern north Pacific Ocean. At the same time, a mid-tropospheric trough slowly intensified while gradually undergoing cyclogenesis to develop into a cold-core upper-level low. The cold-core low rapidly intensified as convection increased, and late on August 31, it absorbed the remnants of Ilsa, which influenced the development of the system. Convection steadily organized as it tracked westward, and it is estimated it transitioned into a subtropical depression by 18:00 UTC on September 1.

With warm water temperatures, the system strengthened and began to develop tropical characteristics. The storm quickly developed a central dense overcast, and by 00:00 UTC on September 3 Dvorak classifications began on the cyclone.

Additionally, upon developing a closed eyewall, the cyclone was beginning to interact with the frontal system to its west. Maintaining hurricane status for about 18 hours, the storm continued rapidly northeastward and weakened, due to strong wind shear from the approaching cold front. On the same day, the circulation was rapidly absorbed by the frontal system, and the remnants quickly reached the coast of British Columbia. The remnants of the storm turned southeastward, and was last tracked definitively to a point north of Montana.

Impact and records

At 18:00 UTC on September 3, a ship named Pluvius recorded  winds near the center of the storm. No significant land impact occurred in association with the cyclone, and no fatalities were reported.

Forming at 31° N, the storm formed farther north than any other Pacific tropical cyclone at the time, though, in 2000, Tropical Storm Wene formed farther to the north. The cyclone marked the first known occurrence of a mid-Pacific upper tropospheric low developing into a tropical cyclone, though Tropical Storm Fausto in 2002 redeveloped in a similar occurrence to the hurricane. The cyclone attained hurricane status at 40° N, a record for a Pacific hurricane. Only Tropical Storm Dot in 1970, Hurricane John in 1994, Tropical Depression Guillermo in 1997, and Tropical Storm Wene in 2000 were tropical cyclones north of the latitude, of which only John was a hurricane; none maintained tropical cyclone status further north than the cyclone.

See also
 List of Pacific hurricanes
 2006 Central Pacific cyclone
 Subtropical Storm 96C
 1996 Lake Huron cyclone
 1975 Pacific hurricane season

References

Pacific Northwest hurricane
Category 1 Pacific hurricanes
Pacific Northwest storms